Bishop Robinson may refer to:

Bishop Gene Robinson, bishop of the Episcopal Church in the United States of America
Bishop L. Robinson (police commissioner) (1927–2014), police commissioner of Baltimore, Maryland